Sharipkulovo (Şäripqol) is a rural locality (a village) in Karlamansky Selsoviet, Karmaskalinsky District, Bashkortostan, Russia. The population was 403 as of 2010. There are 7 streets.

Geography 
Sharipkulovo is located 16 km east of Karmaskaly (the district's administrative centre) by road. Ivanovka is the nearest rural locality.

References 

Rural localities in Karmaskalinsky District